Savigneux is a commune in the Loire department in central France.

Population

Twin towns
Savigneux is twinned with:

  Essenbach, Germany
  Savignano Irpino, Italy
  Rosenau, Haut-Rhin, France

See also
Communes of the Loire department

References

Communes of Loire (department)